The 1995 FIVB Men's World Cup was held from 18 November to 2 December 1995 in Japan. Twelve men's national teams played in cities all over Japan for the right to a fast lane ticket into the 1996 Summer Olympics in Atlanta. The first three qualified.

The twelve competing teams played a single-round robin format, in two parallel groups (site A and site B). The men played in Tokyo, Sendai, Fukushima, Chiba, Hiroshima, Kumamoto, and Kagoshima.

Qualification

Results

|}

All times are Japan Standard Time (UTC+09:00).

First round

Site A
Location: Tokyo

|}

Site B
Location: Kumamoto

|}

Second round

Site A
Location: Hiroshima

|}

Site B
Location: Kumamoto

|}

Third round

Site A
Location: Sendai

|}

Site B
Location: Fukushima

|}

Fourth round

Site A
Location: Tokyo

|}

Site B
Location: Chiba

|}

Final standing

Awards

 Most Valuable Player
  Andrea Giani
 Best Scorer
  Marcos Milinkovic
 Best Spiker
  Bas van de Goor
 Best Server
  Lloy Ball

 Best Blocker
  Jason Haldane
 Best Digger
  Pablo Pereira
 Best Setter
  Peter Blangé
 Best Receiver
  Gino Brousseau

References

1995 Men's
W
V
V